Reinoud may refer to:

 Reinoud I van Brederode (1336–1390)
 Reinoud II of Guelders (c. 1295–1343)
 Reinoud II van Brederode (1415–1473)
 Reinoud III of Guelders (1333–1371)
 Reinoud III van Brederode (1492–1556)
 Reinald IV, Duke of Guelders and Jülich (1365–1423)
 Reinoud IV van Brederode (1520–1584), father of Walraven III van Brederode
 Reinoud van Brederode (1567–1633), lord of Veenhuizen, North Holland and Wesenberg (Rakvere), Estonia

See also
 Reinaud (disambiguation)
 Reynaud, a surname
 Reynoud Diederik Jacob van Reede, 7th Earl of Athlone